Aux or AUX may refer to:

Science and technology
 Auxiliary connector or AUX jack, typically used for analog audio signals
 Aux/IAA repressors, related to auxin plant hormones

Computing
 AUX: (for auxiliary), a DOS text device
 AUX (CONFIG.SYS directive), changes assignment for AUX: device in DR-DOS
 A/UX, a Unix operating system by Apple

Other uses
 Auxiliary (disambiguation) (abbreviation)
 Aux (TV channel), a Canadian music TV channel
 Araguaína Airport (IATA airport code), Tocantins, Brazil